Irene Fitzner (born 14 November 1955) is an Argentine sprinter. She competed in the women's 100 metres at the 1972 Summer Olympics.

References

1955 births
Living people
Athletes (track and field) at the 1971 Pan American Games
Athletes (track and field) at the 1972 Summer Olympics
Argentine female sprinters
Olympic athletes of Argentina
Place of birth missing (living people)
Pan American Games competitors for Argentina
Olympic female sprinters